The Lo Nuestro Award for Tropical Song of the Year (or Lo Nuestro Award for Tropical/Salsa Song of the Year) is an honor presented annually by American network Univision. The Lo Nuestro Awards were first awarded in 1989 and has been given annually since to recognize the most talented performers of Latin music. The nominees and winners were originally selected by a voting poll conducted among program directors of Spanish-language radio stations in the United States and also based on chart performance on Billboard Latin music charts, with the results being tabulated and certified by the accounting firm Deloitte. As of 2004, the winners are selected through an online survey. The trophy awarded is shaped in the form of a treble clef.

The award was first presented to "Ven, Devórame Otra Vez" by Puerto-Rican artist Lalo Rodríguez. American singer Marc Anthony is the most awarded performer with four awards and is also the most nominated performer with sixteen nominations. In 2001, "A Puro Dolor" by Puerto-Rican band Son by Four won Lo Nuestro Awards for both Tropical Song of the Year and Pop Song of the Year. "El Costo de la Vida" by Dominican artist Juan Luis Guerra, "Abriendo Puertas" by Cuban-American singer Gloria Estefan, "Y Hubo Alguien" and "Ahora Quién" by American performer Marc Anthony, "Suavemente" by Puerto-Rican songwriter Elvis Crespo, "Cómo Olvidar" by Puerto-Rican artist Olga Tañón, "Por Un Segundo" by Aventura, and "A Puro Dolor", earned the award and also reached number-one at the Billboard Hot Latin Songs chart.  American performer Víctor Manuelle and Puerto-Rican American singers Jerry Rivera and Gilberto Santa Rosa are the most nominated performers without a win, with five unsuccessful nominations each.

Winners and nominees
Listed below are the winners of the award for each year, as well as the other nominees for the majority of the years awarded.

Multiple wins/nominations

See also
 Latin Grammy Award for Best Tropical Song

References

Tropical Song
Tropical music
Song awards
Awards established in 1989